Ashurst may refer to:

Places

United Kingdom
Ashurst, Hampshire
Served by Ashurst New Forest railway station
Ashurst, Kent
Served by Ashurst (Kent) railway station
Ashurst, Lancashire
Ashurst, West Sussex
Ashurst Wood, West Sussex

Other places
Ashurst, Arizona, United States
Ashhurst, a town in New Zealand

Other uses
Ashurst (surname)
Ashurst baronets, an English baronetcy
Ashurst LLP, an international law firm headquartered in London
Ashurst Australia, subsidiary of Ashurst LLP